Robert Roland Davies (b Canterbury 15 September 1805- d Hobart 13 November 1880) was an Anglican priest in Australia.

Davies was educated at Trinity College, Dublin. He was ordained in 1828. His first post was a curacy at Kilbrin. In 1830 he arrived in Tasmania. In 1850 he came the Archdeacon of Launceston, Tasmania and in 1854 Archdeacon of Hobart.

References

1805 births
People from Canterbury
1880 deaths
Anglican archdeacons in Tasmania
19th-century Australian Anglican priests
Alumni of Trinity College Dublin